Arnaldo Javier Pereira Vera (born 11 January 1985) is a Paraguayan footballer.

Club career
Vera played for club Deportivo Capiatá in 2013 and also played for Guabirá in 2017.

References
 
 

1985 births
Living people
Paraguayan footballers
Paraguayan expatriate footballers
Sport Colombia footballers
Club Sol de América footballers
Lota Schwager footballers
Alianza Petrolera players
Deportivo Capiatá players
Guabirá players
Sportivo Luqueño players
Paraguayan Primera División players
Categoría Primera A players
Expatriate footballers in Chile
Expatriate footballers in Colombia
Expatriate footballers in Bolivia
Association football defenders